The list of Kannada feature films released by the Kannada film Industry located in Bangalore, Karnataka in the 1950s.

1950

1951

1952

1953

1954

1955

1956

1957

1958

1959

See also
 Kannada cinema

References
 Kannada cinema database by University of Pennsylvania

External links
 Kannada Movies of the 1950s at the Internet Movie Database

1950s
Kannada-language
Films, Kannada